Sha'ar Binyamin is an Israeli light industrial park in the occupied West Bank, built in 1998 over land expropriated from the Palestinian villages of  Jaba' and Mukhmas. It is located the Mateh Binyamin Regional Council, Israeli-occupied West Bank, located 2km north of Geva Binyamin on Route 60 and about 5 minutes drive from Pisgat Ze'ev in Jerusalem. The park covers an area of 606 dunams (150 acres).

The international community considers Israeli settlements in the West Bank illegal under international law, but the Israeli government disputes this.

History
According to ARIJ, Israel confiscated land from two nearby Palestinian villages in order to construct Sha'ar Binyamin:

545 dunams from Jaba', and
28 dunams from Mukhmas.

It was established by the Regional Council's "Industrial Zones Authority," which promotes development in its area. The Israeli Industry, Trade and Labor Ministry also invested about 20 million Israeli new shekel in developing the region. The park was granted "National Priority Area A" status in 2002 for a 13-year period  enabling tax benefits to create jobs for residents of the Jewish and Arab communities in the region. Public transportation is provided by buses along Route 60.

Like other industrial parks in the West Bank, many Israelis and Palestinians coexist and work side by side in factories and stores at Sha'ar Binyamin.

One of the big draws is a Rami Levy supermarket.  There are also bakeries (including a bakery which is experimenting in baking showbread as was used in the Temple in Jerusalem), furniture stores, clothing stores, hardware and housewares stores, auto leasing, auto repair shops, a computer store, a winery, an optician, and a dental clinic.  Offices of The Jewish Agency's Settlement Division, an events hall and a section designated for high-tech businesses can also be found in the park.

The industrial park is located above the drainage basin of the Nahal Prat Nature Reserve and is therefore subject to rigorous standards on soil and water pollution. A water purification facility processes the park's waste water and the establishment of polluting heavy industry is prohibited.

References

External links
Sha'ar Binyamin on Israel Ministry of Industry, Trade and Labor website 
Sha'ar Binyamin on Mateh Binyamin Regional Council website 
Plot map of Sha'ar Binyamin (opens as Word Document) 

Economy of Israel
Industrial parks in Israeli-occupied territories
Mateh Binyamin Regional Council
Israeli industrial parks in the West Bank